Manuel Amador Miguel Pizarro Moreno (born Teruel, September 29, 1951) is an economist, Spanish jurist, Lawyer of the State, exchange agent and stock exchange and former president of Endesa. He is academic of number of the Royal Academy of Jurisprudence and Legislation, of the Royal Academy of Economic and Financial Sciences and of the Aragonese Academy of Jurisprudence and Legislation.

Pizarro was also deputy of the Congress for the People's Party, between 2008 and January 29, 2010, when he left his seat as well as active politics.

References

External links 

 https://www.bloomberg.com/research/stocks/people/person.asp?personId=324780&privcapId=357076
 http://www.elmundo.es/loc/2016/12/29/5864f697268e3ec1368b465b.html
 https://www.libertaddigital.com/personajes/manuel-pizarro/

1951 births
Living people
Spanish economists
21st-century Spanish lawyers
Spanish politicians